Ahmad ibn Hanbal al-Dhuhli (November 780 – 2 August 855 CE/164–241 AH), was a Muslim jurist, theologian, ascetic, hadith traditionist, and founder of the Hanbali school of Sunni jurisprudence — one of the four major orthodox legal schools of Sunni Islam.
The most highly influential and active scholar during his lifetime, Ibn Hanbal went on to become "one of the most venerated" intellectual figures in Islamic history, who has had a "profound influence affecting almost every area of" the traditionalist perspective within Sunni Islam. One of the foremost classical proponents of relying on scriptural sources as the basis for Sunni Islamic law and way of life, Ibn Hanbal compiled one of the most important Sunni hadith collections, the Musnad, which has continued to exercise considerable influence in the field of hadith studies up to the present time.

Having studied fiqh and hadith under many teachers during his youth, Ibn Hanbal became famous in his later life for the crucial role he played in the Mihna, the inquisition instituted by the Abbasid Caliph al-Ma'mun towards the end of his reign, in which the ruler gave official state support to the Muʿtazilite dogma of the Quran being created, a view that contradicted the orthodox doctrine of the Quran being the eternal, uncreated Word of God. Living in poverty throughout his lifetime working as a baker and suffering physical persecution under the caliphs for his unflinching adherence to the traditional doctrine, Ibn Hanbal's fortitude in this particular event only bolstered his "resounding reputation" in the annals of Sunni history.

Throughout Sunni Islamic history, Ibn Hanbal was venerated as an exemplary figure in all the traditional schools of Sunni thought, both by the exoteric ulema and by the mystics, with the latter often designating him as a saint in their hagiographies. The fourteenth-century hadith master al-Dhahabi referred to Ibn Hanbal as "the true Shaykh of Islām and leader of the Muslims in his time, the ḥadīth master and Proof of the Religion."

In the modern era, Ibn Hanbal's name has become controversial in certain quarters of the Islamic world, because the Hanbali reform movement known as Wahhabism has cited him as a principal influence along with the thirteenth-century Hanbali reformer Ibn Taymiyyah. However it has been argued by certain scholars that Ibn Hanbal's own beliefs actually played "no real part in the establishment of the central doctrines of Wahhabism," as there is evidence, according to the same authors, that "the older Hanbalite authorities had doctrinal concerns very different from those of the Wahhabis," rich as medieval Hanbali literature is in references to saints, grave visitation, miracles, and relics. In this connection, scholars have cited Ibn Hanbal's own support for  the use of relics as simply one of several important points upon which the theologian's opinions diverged from those of Wahhabism. Other scholars maintain that Ahmād Ibn Hānbal was "the distant progenitor of Wahhābism" who also immensely inspired the conservative reform movement of Salafiyya.

Biography

Early life and family

Ahmad ibn Hanbal's family was originally from Basra, Iraq, and belonged to the Arab Banu Dhuhl tribe. His father was an officer in the Abbasid army in Khurasan and later settled with his family in Baghdad, where Ahmad was born in 780 CE.

Ibn Hanbal had two wives and several children, including an older son, who later became a judge in Isfahan.

Education and work
Ahmad studied extensively in Baghdad, and later traveled to further his education. He started learning jurisprudence (Fiqh) under the celebrated Hanafi judge, Abu Yusuf, the renowned student and companion of Imaam Abu Hanifah. After finishing his studies with Abu Yusuf, ibn Hanbal began traveling through Iraq, Syria, and Arabia to collect hadiths, or traditions of the Prophet Muhammad. Ibn al-Jawzi states that Imam Ahmad had 414 Hadith masters whom he narrated from. With this knowledge, he became a leading authority on the hadith, leaving an immense encyclopedia of hadith, Musnad Ahmad ibn Hanbal. After several years of travel, he returned to Baghdad to study Islamic law under Al-Shafi'i.

Ahmad became a mufti in his old age, and founded the Hanbali madhab, or school of Islamic law, which is now most dominant in Saudi Arabia, Qatar, and the United Arab Emirates. Unlike the other three schools of Islamic jurisprudence (Hanafi, Maliki, and Shafi), the Hanbali madhab remained largely traditionalist or Athari in theology.

In addition to his scholastic enterprises, ibn Hanbal was a soldier on the Islamic frontiers (Ribat) and made Hajj five times in his life, twice on foot.

Death

Ibn Hanbal died on Friday, 12 Rabi-ul-awwal, 241 AH/ 2 August, 855 at the age of 74–75 in Baghdad, Iraq. Historians relate that his funeral was attended by 800,000 men and 60,000 women and that 20,000 Christians and Jews converted to Islam on that day. His qabr (grave) is located in the premises of the Imam Ahmad Bin Hanbal Shrine in Ar-Rusafa District.

The Mihna

Ibn Hanbal was known to have been called before the Inquisition or Mihna of the Abbasid Caliph Al-Ma'mun. Al-Ma'mun wanted to assert the religious authority of the Caliph by pressuring scholars to adopt the Mu'tazila view that the Qur'an was created rather than uncreated. According to Sunni tradition, ibn Hanbal was among the scholars to resist the Caliph's interference and the Mu'tazili doctrine of a created Qur'an. Ibn Hanbal's stand against the inquisition by the Mu'tazila (who had been the ruling authority at the time) led to the Hanbali school establishing itself firmly as not only a school of fiqh (legal jurisprudence), but of theology as well.

Due to his refusal to accept Mu'tazilite authority, ibn Hanbal was imprisoned in Baghdad throughout the reign of al-Ma'mun. In an incident during the rule of al-Ma'mun's successor, al-Mu'tasim, ibn Hanbal was flogged to unconsciousness. However, this caused upheaval in Baghdad and al-Mu'tasim was forced to release ibn Hanbal. After al-Mu’tasim's death, al-Wathiq became caliph and continued his predecessor's policies of Mu'tazilite enforcement and in this pursuit, he banished ibn Hanbal from Baghdad. It was only after al-Wathiq's death and the ascent of his brother al-Mutawakkil, who was much friendlier to the more traditional Sunni beliefs, that ibn Hanbal was welcomed back to Baghdad.

Views and thought
Ibn Hanbal's principal doctrine is what later came to be known as "traditionalist thought," which emphasized the acceptance of only the Quran and hadith as the foundations of orthodox belief. He did, however, believe that it was only a select few who were properly authorized to interpret the sacred texts.

Theology

God
Ibn Hanbal understood the perfect definition of God to be that given in the Quran, whence he held that proper belief in God constituted believing in the description which God had given of Himself in the Islamic scripture. To begin with, Ibn Hanbal asserted that God was both Unique and Absolute and absolutely incomparable to anything in the world of His creatures. As for the various divine attributes, Ibn Hanbal believed that all the regular attributes of God, such as hearing, sight, speech, omnipotence, will, wisdom, the vision by the believers on the day of resurrection etc., were to be literally affirmed as "realities" (ḥaqq). As for those attributes called "ambiguous" (mutas̲h̲ābih), such as those which spoke of God's hand, face, throne, and omnipresence, vision by the believers on the day of resurrection, etc. they were to be understood in the same manner. Ibn Hanbal treated those verses in the scriptures with apparently anthropomorphic descriptions as muhkamat (clear) verses; admitting to only a literal meaning.

Furthermore, Ibn Hanbal "rejected the negative theology (taʿṭīl) of the Jahmiyya and their particular allegorizing exegesis (taʾwīl) of the Quran and of tradition, and no less emphatically criticized the anthropomorphism (tas̲h̲bīh) of the Mus̲h̲abbiha, amongst whom he included, in the scope of his polemics, the Jahmiyya as unconscious anthropomorphists." Ibn Hanbal was also a critic of overt and unnecessary speculation in matters of theology; he believed that it was fair to worship God "without the 'mode' of the theologoumena (bilā kayf), and felt it was wise to leave to God the understanding of His own mystery. Thus, Ibn Hanbal became a strong proponent of the bi-lā kayfa formula. This mediating principle allowed the traditionalists to deny ta'wil (figurative interpretations) of the apparently anthropomorphic texts while concomitantly affirming the doctrine of the "incorporeal, transcendent deity". Although he argued for literalist meanings of the Qur'anic and prophetic statements about God, Ibn Hanbal was not a fideist and was willing to engage in hermeneutical exercises. The rise of Imam Ahmad ibn Hanbal and the Ashab al-Hadith, whose cause he championed, during the Mihna; would mark the stage for the empowerment and centering of corporealist ideas in the Sunnite orthodoxy.

Ibn Hanbal also recognized "Divine Form (Al-Şūrah)" as a true attribute of God. He disagreed with those speculative theologians who interpreted the Divine Form as something that represents pseudo-divinities such as the sun, moon, stars, etc. For Ibn Hanbal, to deny that God truly has a Form is Kufr (disbelief). He also believed that God created Adam "according to His form". Censuring those who alleged that this was referring to the form of Adam, Ibn Hanbal asserted: "He who says that Allah created Adam according to the form of Adam, he is a Jahmi (disbeliever). Which form did Adam have before He created him?"

The Quran
One of Ibn Hanbal's most famous contributions to Sunni thought was the considerable role he played in bolstering the orthodox doctrine of the Quran being the "uncreated Word of God" (kalām Allāh g̲h̲ayr mak̲h̲lūḳ). By "Quran," Ibn Hanbal understood "not just an abstract idea but the Quran with its letters, words, expressions, and ideas—the Quran in all its living reality, whose nature in itself," according to Ibn Hanbal, eluded human comprehension.

Taqlid 

Ahmad ibn Hanbal favoured Ijtihad and rejected Taqlid; the practise of blind adherence to madhabs (legal schools). Ahmad ibn Hanbal's staunch condemnation of Taqlid is reported in Hanbali Qadi 'Abd al-Rahman ibn Hassan's treatise (1196-1285 A.H / 1782-1868 C.E) Fath al-Majeed. Comparing Taqlid to Shirk (polytheism), ibn Hanbal states: "I am amazed at those people who know that a Sanad (i.e. Chain of Transmission) is authentic and yet, in spite of this, they follow the opinion of Sufyan, for Allah (Glorified be He), says: {And let those who oppose the Messenger's commandment (i.e. his Sunnah - legal ways, orders, acts of worship, statements) (among the sects) beware, lest some Fitnah (disbelief, trials, afflictions, earthquakes, killing, overpowered by a tyrant) should befall them or a painful torment be inflicted on them}. (An-Nur: 63) Do you know what that Fitnah is? That Fitnah is Shirk (polytheism). Maybe the rejection of some of his words would cause one to doubt and deviate in his heart and thereby be destroyed."

Intercession
It is narrated by Abū Bakr al-Marwazī in his Mansak that Ibn Hanbal preferred one to make tawassul or "intercession" through the Prophet in every supplication, with the wording: "O God! I am turning to Thee with Thy Prophet, the Prophet of Mercy. O Muhammad! I am turning with you to my Lord for the fulfillment of my need." This report is repeated in many later Hanbali works, in the context of personal supplication as an issue of jurisprudence. Ibn Qudamah, for example, recommends it for the obtainment of need in his Wasiyya. In the same way, Ibn Taymiyyah cites the Hanbali fatwa on the desirability of the Prophet's intercession in every personal supplication in his Qāida fil-Tawassul wal-Wasiīla where he attributes it to "Imām Ahmad and a group of the pious ancestors" from the Mansak of al-Marwazī as his source.

Mysticism
As there exist historical sources indicating patently "mystical elements in his personal piety" and documented evidence of his amiable interactions with numerous early Sufi saints, including Maruf Karkhi, it is recognized that Ibn Hanbal's relationship with many of the Sufis was one of mutual respect and admiration. Qadi Abu Ya'la reports in his Tabaqat: "[Ibn Hanbal] used to greatly respect the Sūfīs and show them kindness and generosity. He was asked about them and was told that they sat in mosques constantly to which he replied, 'Knowledge made them sit.'" Furthermore, it is in Ibn Hanbal's Musnad that we find most of the hadith reports concerning the abdal, forty major saints "whose number [according to Islamic mystical doctrine] would remain constant, one always being replaced by some other on his death" and whose key role in the traditional Sufi conception of the celestial hierarchy would be detailed by later mystics such as Hujwiri and Ibn Arabi. It has been reported that Ibn Hanbal explicitly identified Maruf Karkhi as one of the abdal, saying: "He is one of the Substitute-Saints, and his supplication is answered." Of the same Sufi, Ibn Hanbal later asked rhetorically: "Is religious knowledge anything else than what Maruf has achieved?" Additionally, there are accounts of Ibn Hanbal extolling the early ascetic saint Bishr the Barefoot and his sister as two exceptional devotees of God, and of his sending people with mystical questions to Bishr for guidance. It is also recorded that Ibn Hanbal said, with regard to the early Sufis, "I do not know of any people better than them." Moreover, there are accounts of Ibn Hanbal's son, Sālih, being exhorted by his father to go and study under the Sufis. According to one tradition, Sālih said: "My father would send for me whenever a self-denier or ascetic (zāhid aw mutaqashshif) visited him so I could look at him. He loved for me to become like this."

As for the Sufis' reception of Ibn Hanbal, it is evident that he was "held in high regard" by all the major Sufis of the classical and medieval periods, and later Sufi chroniclers often designated the jurist as a saint in their hagiographies, praising him both for his legal work and for his appreciation of Sufi doctrine. Hujwiri, for example, wrote of him: "He was distinguished by devoutness and piety ... Sufis of all orders regard him as blessed. He associated with great Shaykhs, such as Dhul-Nun of Egypt, Bishr al-Hafi, Sari al-Saqati, Maruf Karkhi, and others. His miracles were manifest and his intelligence sound ... He had a firm belief in the principles of religion, and his creed was approved by all the [theologians]." Both non-Hanbali and Hanbali Sufi hagiographers such as Hujwiri and Ibn al-Jawzi, respectively, also alluded to Ibn Hanbal's own gifts as a miracle worker and of the blessedness of his grave. For example, Ibn Hanbal's own body was traditionally held to have been blessed with the miracle of incorruptibility, with Ibn al-Jawzi relating: "When the Prophet's descendant Abū Ja'far ibn Abī Mūsā was buried next to him, Ahmad ibn Hanbal's tomb was exposed. His corpse had not putrified and the shroud was still whole and undecayed."

Although there is a perception that Ibn Hanbal or his school were somehow adverse to Sufism, scholars such as Eric Geoffrey have asserted that this opinion is more partial than objective, for there is no proof that the Hanbali school "[attacked] Sufism in itself any more than any other school," and it is evident that "during the first centuries some major Sufis [such as Ibn Ata Allah, Hallaj, and Abdullah Ansari] ... followed the Hanbalite school of law." By the twelfth-century, the relationship between Hanbalism and Sufism was so close that one of the most prominent Hanbali jurists, Abdul Qadir Jilani, was also simultaneously the most famous Sufi of his era, and the Tariqa that he founded, the Qadiriyya, has continued to remain one of the most widespread Sufi orders up until the present day. Even later Hanbali authors who were famous for criticizing some of the "deviances" of certain heterodox Sufi orders of their day, such as Ibn Qudamah, Ibn al-Jawzi, and Ibn Qayyim al-Jawziyya, all belonged to Abdul Qadir Jilani's order themselves, and never condemned Sufism outright.

Relics
As has been noted by scholars, it is evident that Ibn Hanbal "believed in the power of relics," and supported the seeking of blessing through them in religious veneration. Indeed, several accounts of Ibn Hanbal's life relate that he often carried "a purse ... in his sleeve containing ... hairs from the Prophet." Furthermore, Ibn al-Jawzi relates a tradition narrated by Ibn Hanbal's son, Abdullah ibn Ahmad ibn Hanbal, who recalled his father's devotion towards relics thus: "I saw my father take one of the Prophet's hairs, place it over his mouth, and kiss it. I may have seen him place it over his eyes, and dip it in water and then drink the water for a cure." In the same way, Ibn Hanbal also drunk from the Prophet's bowl (technically a "second-class" relic) in order to seek blessings from it, and considered touching and kissing the sacred minbar of the Prophet for blessings a permissible and pious act. Ibn Hanbal later ordered that he be buried with the hairs of the Prophet he possessed, "one on each eye and a third on his tongue."

Sufi scholar Gibril Haddad reports from al-Dhahabi  that Ibn Hanbal "used to seek blessings from the relics of the Prophet." Citing the aforementioned report of Ibn Hanbal's devotion towards the Prophet's hair, al-Dhahabī then goes onto staunchly criticize whoever finds fault with the practices of tabarruk or seeking blessings from holy relics, saying: "Where is the quibbling critic of Imām Ahmad now? It is also authentically established that Abd Allāh [Ibn Hanbal's son] asked his father about those who touch the pommel of the Prophet's pulpit and touch the wall of the Prophet's room, and he said: 'I do not see any harm in it.' May God protect us and you from the opinion of the dissenters and from innovations!"

When asked by his son Abdullah about the legitimacy of touching and kissing the grave of the Prophet in Medina, Ibn Hanbal is said to have approved of both these acts as being permissible according to sacred law.

Jurisprudence
According to Hanbali scholar Najm al-Din Tufi (d. 716 A.H/ 1316 C.E), Ahmad ibn Hanbal did not formulate a legal theory; since "his entire concern was with hadith and its collection". More than a century after Ahmad's death, Hanbali legalism would emerge as a distinct school; due to the efforts of jurists like Abu Bakr al-Athram (d. 261 A.H/ 874 C.E), Harb al-Kirmani (d. 280 A.H/ 893 C.E), 'Abd Allah ibn Ahmad (d. 290 A.H/903 C.E), Abu Bakr al-Khallal (d. 311 A.H/ 923 C.E) etc., who compiled Ahmad's various legal verdicts.

Independent reasoning by muftis
Ibn Hanbal also had a strict criterion for ijtihad or independent reasoning in matters of law by muftis and the ulema. One story narrates that Ibn Hanbal was asked by Zakariyyā ibn Yaḥyā al-Ḍarīr about "how many memorized ḥadīths are sufficient for someone to be a mufti [meaning a mujtahid jurist or one capable of issuing independently-reasoned fatwas]." According to the narrative, Zakariyyā asked: "Are one-hundred thousand sufficient?" to which Ibn Hanbal responded in the negative, with Zakariyyā asking if two-hundred thousand were, to which he received the same response from the jurist. Thus, Zakariyyā kept increasing the number until, at five-hundred thousand, Ibn Hanbal said: "I hope that that should be sufficient." As a result, it has been argued that Ibn Hanbal disapproved of independent reasoning by those muftis who were not absolute masters in law and jurisprudence.

Misusing ahadith
Ibn Hanbal narrated from Muḥammad ibn Yaḥyā al-Qaṭṭān that the latter said: "If someone were to follow every rukhṣa [dispensation] that is in the ḥadīth, he would become a transgressor (fāsiq)." It is believed that he quoted this on account of the vast number of forged traditions of the Prophet.

Private interpretation
Ibn Hanbal appears to have been a formidable opponent of "private interpretation," and actually held that it was only the religious scholars who were qualified to properly interpret the holy texts. One of the creeds attributed to Ibn Hanbal opens with: "Praise be to God, who in every age and interval between prophets (fatra) elevated learned men possessing excellent qualities, who call upon him who goes astray (to return) to the right way." It has been pointed out that this particular creed "explicitly opposes the use of personal judgement (raʾy) ... [as basis] of jurisprudence."

Ethics

Differences of opinion
Ibn Hanbal was praised both in his own life and afterwards for his "serene acceptance of juridicial divergences among the various schools of Islamic law". According to later notable scholars of the Hanbali school like Ibn Aqil and Ibn Taymiyyah, Ibn Hanbal "considered every madhhab correct and abhorred that a jurist insist people follow his even if he considered them wrong and even if the truth is one in any given matter."<ref>Gibril F. Haddad, The Four Imams and Their Schools (London: Muslim Academic Trust, 2007), p. 306; see Ibn Taymiyyah, Majmū' al-Fatāwā, 20:365</ref> As such, when Ibn Hanbal's student Ishāq ibn Bahlūl al-Anbārī had "compiled a book on juridicial differences ... which he had named The Core of Divergence (Lubāb al-Ikhtilāf)," Ibn Hanbal advised him to name the work The Book of Leeway (Kitāb al-Sa'a) instead.

Works

The following books are found in Ibn al-Nadim's Fihrist:
 Usool as-Sunnah: "Foundations of the Prophetic Tradition (in Belief)"
 as-Sunnah: "The Prophet Tradition (in Belief)"
 Kitab al-`Ilal wa Ma‘rifat al-Rijal: "The Book of Narrations Containing Hidden Flaws and of Knowledge of the Men (of Hadeeth)" Riyad: Al-Maktabah al-Islamiyyah
 Kitab al-Manasik: "The Book of the Rites of Hajj"
 Kitab al-Zuhd: "The Book of Abstinence" ed. Muhammad Zaghlul, Beirut: Dar al-Kitab al-'Arabi, 1994
 Kitab al-Iman: "The Book of Faith"
 Kitab al-Masa'il: "Issues in Fiqh"
 Kitab al-Ashribah: "The Book of Drinks"
 Kitab al-Fada'il Sahaba: "Virtues of the Companions"
 Kitab Tha'ah al-Rasul : "The Book of Obedience to the Messenger"
 Kitab Mansukh: "The Book of Abrogation"
 Kitab al-Fara'id: "The Book of Obligatory Duties"
 Kitab al-Radd `ala al-Zanadiqa wa'l-Jahmiyya: "Refutations of the Heretics and the Jahmites" (Cairo: 1973)
 Tafsir: "Exegesis"
 Musnad Ahmad ibn HanbalHistorical views
Ibn Hanbal has been extensively praised for both his work in the field of prophetic tradition (hadith), jurisprudence, and his defense of orthodox Sunni theology. Abdul-Qadir Gilani stated that a Muslim could not truly be a wali of Allah except that they were upon Ibn Hanbal's creed; despite praise from his contemporaries as well, Yahya ibn Ma'in noted that Ibn Hanbal never boasted about his achievements.

 Jurisprudence 
There have some alleged views that his juristic views were not always accepted. Qur'anic exegete Muhammad ibn Jarir al-Tabari, who at one time had sought to study under Ibn Hanbal, later stated that he did not consider Ibn Hanbal a jurist and gave his views in the field no weight, describing him as an expert in prophetic tradition only. However this must be seen in context of its time, as Ibn Hanbal's school was still at its infancy and not followed by so many people yet compared to the other schools and the students had conflict with Al-Tabari's school. Consider how the Masa'il of Imam Ahmad, i.e. the first written compilation of Ibn Hanbal's question and answers, was written by Abu Bakr al-Khallal who lived around the same time as Al-Tabari, and the first written compilation of Ibn Hanbal's fiqh was Al-Khiraqi who also lived around that same time. The more systematic teaching of Ibn Hanbal's jurisprudence in education facilities only occurred after that point.

Likewise, some consider how the Andalusian scholar Ibn 'Abd al-Barr did not include Ibn Hanbal or his views in his book The Hand-Picked Excellent Merits of the Three Great Jurisprudent Imâms about the main representatives of Sunni jurisprudence. However, Ibn 'Abd al-Barr actually has praised Ibn Hanbal's jurisprudence by saying "He is very powerful in the fiqh of the madhab of the ahl al-hadith and he is the Imam of the 'ulama of ahl al-hadith."

Be that as it may, the vast majority of other scholars do recognize Ibn Hanbal's prowess as a master jurist worthy of one whose methodology became foundation for its own school of jurisprudence. Imam Shafi'i said, among many other praises, "Ahmad is an Imam in eight fields: he is an imam in hadith, jurisprudence, Al-Qur'an, Al-Lughah, Al-Sunnah, Al-Zuhd, Al-Warak, and Al-Faqr". Al-Dhahabi, one of the most major Islamic biographers, notes in his masterpiece Siyar A'lam Nubala that Ibn Hanbal's status in jurisprudence is alike Al-Layth ibn Sa'd, Malik ibn Anas, Al-Shafi'i, and Abu Yusuf. Muhammad Abu Zahra, a contemporary Hanafi scholar, wrote a book titled Ibn Hanbal: Hayatuhu wa `Asruhu Ara'uhu wa Fiqhuh, and there he mentioned the heavy praises of various other classical scholars towards Ibn Hanbal and his school of jurisprudence.

 Hadith 
It is reported that Ibn Hanbal has reached the title of al Hafidh of Hadith according to Jamal al-Din al-Mizzi classification, as the title bestowment were approved by Ibn Hajar al-Asqalani that Ibn Hanbal has memorized at least 750,000 hadith during his life, more than Muhammad al-Bukhari and Muslim ibn al-Hajjaj who each memorized 300,000 hadith, and Abu Dawud al-Sijistani who memorized 500,000 hadith. Abu Zur'ah mentions that Ibn Hanbal has memorized 1000,000 hadith, 700,000 among them are related to jurisprudence.

While according to the classification from Marfu' Hadith of Ibn Abbas which recorded by Al-Tabarani, Ibn Hanbal has reached the rank of Amir al-Mu'minin al-Hadith, a rank that only reached by very few Hadith scholars in history such as Malik ibn Anas, Yahya ibn Ma'in, Hammad ibn Salamah, Ibn al-Mubarak, and Al-Suyuti. Ibn Hanbal's Musnad is not, however, ranked among the Kutub al-Sittah, the six big collections of hadith.

In popular culture
 Ahmad ibn Hanbal was largely depicted in Qatar TV's 2017 Ramadan drama serial "The Imam" starring Mahyar Khaddour in the lead role.

See also

References

Further reading

Primary

 Al-Ājurrī, Kitāb al-Sharīʿa, Beirut 2000
 Al-Dhahabī, Siyar aʿlām al-nubalāʾ, ed. Shuʿayb al-Arnaʾūṭ and Ḥusayn al-Asad, 25 vols., Beirut 1401–9/1981–8
 Ibn Abī Yaʿlā, Ṭabaqāt al-ḥanābila, ed. Muḥammad Ḥāmid al-Fiqī, 2 vols., Cairo 1952
 Aḥmad b. Ḥanbal, al-Masāʾil wa-l-rasāʾil al-marwiyya ʿan al-imām Aḥmad b. Ḥanbal, ed. ʿAbdallāh b. Salmān b. Sālim al-Aḥmadī, 2 vols., Riyadh 1991
 Aḥmad b. Ḥanbal, al-ʿIlal wa-maʿrifat al-rijāl, ed. Waṣiyyallāh b. Muḥammad ʿAbbās, Bombay 1408/1988
 Aḥmad b. Ḥanbal, Kitāb al-ṣalāh (with a supplement comprising Ibn Qayyim al-Jawziyya's al-Ṣalāh wa-aḥkām tārikīhā), ed. Zakariyyā ʿAlī Yusūf, Cairo 1971
 Aḥmad b. Ḥanbal, Kitāb al-zuhd, ed. Muḥammad Jalāl Sharaf, Beirut 1981
 Aḥmad b. Ḥanbal, al-Musnad lil-imām Aḥmad b. Ḥanbal, ed. Aḥmad Muḥammad Shākir, 20 vols., Cairo 1416/1995
 Aḥmad b. Ḥanbal, al-Radd ʿalā l-zanādiqa wa-l-Jahmiyya, in ʿAlī Sāmī al-Nashshār and ʿAmmār Jumʿī al-Ṭālibī (eds.), ʿAqāʾid al-salaf (Alexandria 1971), 51–103
 Ṣāliḥ b. Ḥanbal, Sīrat al-imām Aḥmad b. Ḥanbal, ed. Fuʾād ʿAbd al-Munʿim Aḥmad, 2 vols. in one, Alexandria 1401/1981
 Ibn al-Jawzī, Manāqib al-imām Aḥmad, ed. ʿĀdil Nuwayhiḍ, Beirut 1393/19732
 Ibn Kathīr, al-Bidāya wa-l-nihāya, 16 vols., Cairo 1418/1998
 Ibn Qayyim al-Jawziyya, Ijtimāʿ al-juyūsh al-islāmiyya, ed. ʿAwwād ʿAbdallāh al-Muʿtaq, Riyadh 1419/1999
 Ibn Taymiyya, Darʾ taʿāruḍ al-ʿaql wa-l-naql, ed. Muḥammad Rashād Sālim, 11 vols., Riyadh 1979–81
 Abū Nuʿaym al-Iṣfahānī, Ḥilyat al-awliyāʾ wa-ṭabaqāt al-aṣfiyāʾ, 10 vols., Beirut 1409/1988
 Marʿī b. Yūsuf al-Karmī, al-Shahāda al-zakiyya fī thanāʾ al-aʾimma ʿalā Ibn Taymiyya, ed. Najm ʿAbd al-Raḥmān Khalaf, Beirut 1404/1984
 Abū Bakr al-Khallāl, al-Sunna, ed. ʿAṭiyya al-Zahrānī, 7 vols., Riyadh 1410/1989
 Abū Bakr Aḥmad b. Muḥammad b. al-Ḥajjāj al-Marwazī, Kitāb al-waraʿ, ed. Samīr b. Amīn al-Zuhayrī, Riyadh 1418/1997.

Secondary

 Binyamin Abrahamov, Islamic theology. Traditionalism and rationalism, Edinburgh 1998
 Binyamin Abrahamov, "The bi-lā kayfa doctrine and its foundations in Islamic theology," Arabica 42/1–3 (1995), 365–79
 Muḥammad Abū Zahra, Ibn Ḥanbal. Ḥayātuhu wa-ʿaṣruhu wa-fiqhuhu, Cairo 1947
 Michael Cooperson, "Aḥmad Ibn Ḥanbal and Bishr al-Ḥāfī. A case study in biographical traditions," SI 86 (1997/2), 71–101
 Michael Cooperson, Classical Arabic biography. The heirs of the prophets in the age of al-Maʾmūn, Cambridge 2000
 Daniel Gimaret, "Theories de l'acte humain dans l'école ḥanbalite," BEO 29 (1977), 157–78
 Ignáz Goldziher, "Aḥmed b. Muḥammad b. Ḥanbal," EI1 Ignáz Goldziher, Vorlesungen über den Islam, Heidelberg 1910
 Gibril F. Haddad, The four imams and their schools, London 2007
 Wael B. Hallaq, "Was al-Shafiʿi the master architect of Islamic jurisprudence?," IJMES, 25 (1993), 590
 Livnat Holtzman, "Human choice, divine guidance and the fiṭra tradition. The use of ḥadīth in theological treatises by Ibn Taymiyya and Ibn Qayyim al-Jawziyya," in Yossef Rapoport and Shahab Ahmed (eds.), Ibn Taymiyya and his times, Karachi 2009
 Livnat Holtzman, Predestination (al-qaḍāʾ wa-l-qadar) and free will (al-ikhtiyār) as reflected in the works of the Neo-Ḥanbalites of the fourteenth century, Ph.D. diss., Bar-Ilan University 2003 (in Hebrew)
 Nimrod Hurvitz, The formation of Ḥanbalism. Piety into power, London 2002
 Nimrod Hurvitz, "From scholarly circles to mass movements. The formation of legal communities in Islamic societies," American Historical Review 108/4 (2003), 985–1008
 Henri Laoust, "Aḥmad b. Ḥanbal," EI2 Henri Laoust, La profession de foi d'Ibn Baṭṭa, Damascus 1958
 Henri Laoust, "Les premières professions de foi ḥanbalites," in Mélanges Louis Massignon (Damascus 1956–7), 3:7–35
 Wilferd Madelung, "The origins of the controversy concerning the creation of the Koran," in J. M. Barral (ed.), Orientalia hispanica (Leiden 1974), 1:504–25
 George Makdisi, "Ḥanbalite Islam," in Merlin L. Swartz (ed.), Studies on Islam (Oxford 1981), 216–64
 Christopher Melchert, "The adversaries of Aḥmad ibn Ḥanbal," Arabica 44 (1997), 234–53
 Christopher Melchert, Ahmad ibn Hanbal, Oxford 2006
 Christopher Melchert, The formation of the Sunni schools of law, 9th–10th centuries C.E., Leiden 1997
 Christopher Melchert, "The Ḥanābila and the early Ṣūfīs," Arabica 48/3 (2001), 352–67
 Christopher Melchert, "The Musnad of Aḥmad ibn Ḥanbal," Der Islam 82 (2005), 32–51
 Christopher Melchert, "The piety of the Hadith folk," IJMES 34 (2002), 425–39
 John A. Nawas, "A reexamination of three current explanations for al-Maʾmūn's introduction of the miḥna," IJMES 26 (1994), 615–29
 Walter M. Patton, Aḥmed ibn Ḥanbal and the miḥna, Leiden 1897
 Muḥammad Z. Siddiqi, Ḥadīth literature, ed. and revised by Abdal Hakim Murad, Cambridge 1993
 Morris S. Seale, Muslim theology. A study of origins with reference to the Church Fathers, London 1964
 Susan Spectorsky, "Aḥmad Ibn Ḥanbal's fiqh," JAOS 102/3 (1982), 461–5
 Susan Spectorsky, Chapters on marriage and divorce. Responses of Ibn Ḥanbal and Ibn Rāhwayh, Austin 1993
 W. Montgomey Watt, The formative period of Islamic thought, Edinburgh 1973
 W. Montgomey Watt, Islamic creeds, Edinburgh 1994
 Wesley Williams, "Aspects of the creed of Imam Ahmad Ibn Hanbal. A study of anthropomorphism in early Islamic discourse," IJMES'' 34 (2002), 441–63.

780 births
855 deaths
8th-century Arabs
9th-century Arabic writers
9th-century Arabs
9th-century jurists
9th-century Muslim scholars of Islam
9th-century people from the Abbasid Caliphate
Scholars from the Abbasid Caliphate
Atharis
Hadith compilers
Hanbalis
Mujaddid
Sunni imams
Sunni Muslim scholars of Islam
Biographical evaluation scholars